is a Shinto shrine located in Takachiho, Miyazaki prefecture, Japan. It is dedicated to Ninigi-no-Mikoto.

Shinto shrines in Miyazaki Prefecture